John Anthony Bowden Cuddon (2 June 1928 – 12 March 1996), was an English author, dictionary writer, and school teacher. He is known best for his Dictionary of Literary Terms (published in several editions), described by the Times Educational Supplement as ‘scholarly, succinct, comprehensive and entertaining…an indispensable work of reference.’ Cuddon also wrote The Macmillan Dictionary of Sport and Games, a two million-word account of most of the world's sports and games through history, as well as several novels, plays, travel books, and other published works. Cuddon's The Owl's Watchsong was a study of Istanbul.

Cuddon also edited two important anthologies of supernatural fiction – The Penguin Book of Ghost Stories and The Penguin Book of Horror Stories (both 1984).

In his distinguished teaching career at Emanuel School in London, England, he taught English. He also coached rugby and cricket.

Bibliography 

Novels

A Multitude of Sins (1961)

Testament of Iscariot (1962)

The Acts of Darkness (1963)

The Six Wounds (1964)

The Bride of Battersea (1967)

Non-fiction

The Owl's Watchsong (1960)

The Companion Guide to Jugoslavia (1974)

A Dictionary of Literary Terms (1977)

The Macmillan Dictionary of Sport and Games (1980)

The Penguin Book of Ghost Stories (1984) (editor)

The Penguin Book of Horror Stories (1984) (editor)

References

External links
 Obituary: The Independent, 16 March 1996.
 Obituary: The Times, 15 March 1996.
 Cuddon, J. A. (revised by C. E. Preston), Dictionary of Literary Terms & Literary Theory, 4th ed. .

1928 births
1996 deaths
English rugby union coaches
English writers
British writers